The Khen dynasty (also Khyen dynasty) of Assam was a late medieval dynasty of erstwhile Kamata kingdom. After the fall of the Pala dynasty of Kamrupa, the western region was reorganized into Kamata kingdom, when Sandhya moved his capital from Kamarupanagara to Kamatapur in about 1257, due to the frequent clashes with the Kacharis from the east.  Sandhya styled himself Kamateswara and the kingdom came to be known as "Kamata". The Khen dynasty at a later period took control of the kingdom.

Origin 
According to the Gosani Mangala (1823), the Khen rulers had a humble origin, implying that they were probably local chieftains that rose to power after the fall of the Palas. Ethnically, the Khen rulers belonged to a Tibeto-Burman ethnolinguistic group. Ethnicity of Khen is not known precisely but may have been associated with Khyen of Indo-Burmese border or Kheng from the mountains.

Though there is no contemporary historical evidence, some data from eighteenth-century's Gosanimangal claim that a boy named Kanta Nath became the Khen ruler Niladwaj who hailed from poor family in Taluk Jambari on the bank of Singimari. Other sources claim Kanta Nath to be a migrant from Tripura. They worshipped Kamatashwari (also called Chandi or Bhavani), thus providing a break from the earlier dynasties that drew their lineage from Narakasura, the son of Vishnu.

Fall
The kingdom of Kamatapura finally fell to Alauddin Husain Shah in 1498. But Hussein Shah could not rule the kingdom— Bhuyan chiefs of the region defeated the invaders in 1505. Soon control of the Kamata kingdom passed into the hands of the Koch dynasty.

Rulers 
 Niladhwaj (1440–1460)
 Chakradhwaj (1460–1480)
 Nilambar (1480–1498)

See also 
 Kamarupa
 Kamata Kingdom
 History of Assam
 Ahom–Mughal conflicts
 List of rulers of Assam
 List of Hindu Empires and Dynasties

Notes

References

 
 
 
 

History of Assam
Dynasties of India